Vladimir Nikolaevich Lyubimenko (1873-1937) was a Russian Empire and later Soviet botanist and academician who worked in the Nikitsky Botanical Garden in Crimea. He researched and wrote on the process of photosynthesis in shade-tolerant plants.

His wife was the historian Inna Lubimenko (1878-1959).

Selected publications
 "On culturing of medicinal herbs on the southern coast of Crimea", Vestnik Russkoy Flory, 1915 (3), pp. 144–50.
 Tabachnaya Promyshlennost v Rossii. Petrograd, 1916.
 Syedobnye Dikorastushchiye Rasteniya Severnoy Polosy Rossii. 2 vols. Petrograd, 1918. (With N. A. Monteverde and A. F. Sulima-Samoylo)
 Chay i Yego Kultura v Rossii. Petrograd, 1919.

References 

Botanists from the Russian Empire
1873 births
1937 deaths
Soviet botanists